Fretworx is the fifth solo studio album by guitarist Brian Tarquin, released in October 2008 on Nu Groove/BHP Music distributed by RED Distribution. All tracks were recorded in New York, at Tarquin's Jungle Room Studios. Guest musicians on the album include Billy Sheehan, Frank Gambale, Steve Morse, Max Middleton, Chuck Loeb, Hal Lindes, Andy Timmons, and Will Ray. The album also featured bonus tracks from Steve Vai & Randy Coven, Carlos Santana and Tommy Bolin. The entire album was engineered, produced, and composed by Tarquin with the exception of the bonus tracks.

Track listing

Personnel
Brian Tarquin – all guitars
Chris Ingram – keyboard, bass 
Reggie Pryor – drums, percussion 
Greg Morrow – drums 
Johnny Mascaluso – drums (track 8)
Billy Sheehan – Bass (track 1)
Doug Doppler – guitar (track 1)
Frank Gambale – guitar (track 2)
Steve Morse – guitar (track 3)
Will Ray – guitar (track 4)
Randy Coven – guitar (tracks 5 & 7)
Max Middleton – Rhodes piano (tracks 6 & 11)
Andy Timmons – guitar (track 8)
Hal Lindes – guitar (track 10)
Rob Balducci – guitar (track 12)
Chuck Loeb – guitar (track 13)
James Ryan – guitar (track 14)
Steve Booke – guitar (track 15)
Todd Turkisher – drums (track 16)
Jim Hickey – guitars (track 16)
Neal Schon – guitars (track 17)
Greg Rollie – keyboard (track 17)
Michael Shrieve – drums (track 17)
Chepito Areas – percussion (track 17)
Carlos Santana – lead guitar (track 17)
David Brown – bass (track 17)
Michael Carabello – congas (track 17)
Tommy Bolin – guitars (track 18)
Brian Tarquin – mix engineer, producer
Chris Landen of Pacific Coast Mastering – mastering engineer
Todd Doney – cover painting
Miss M – graphic design

References

External links
 
 

2008 albums
Brian Tarquin albums